The women's cycling team sprint at the 2016 Olympic Games in Rio de Janeiro took place on 12 August 2016.

The event was won by the Chinese pairing of Gong Jinjie and Zhong Tianshi over the Russian pairing of Daria Shmeleva and Anastasia Voynova. The defending champions, Germans Kristina Vogel and Miriam Welte, won the bronze medal.

The medals were presented by Yang Yang, IOC member, China and Marian Stenina, Member of the UCI Management Committee.

Competition format
The women's team sprint race consists of a two-lap race between two teams of two cyclists, starting on opposite sides of the track. Each member of the team must lead for one of the laps.

Schedule 
All times are Brasília Time (UTC-03:00)

Results

Qualification 
The fastest 8 teams qualify for the first round.

 Q = qualified

First round 
First round heats are held as follows:
Heat 1: 4th v 5th qualifier
Heat 2: 3rd v 6th qualifier
Heat 3: 2nd v 7th qualifier
Heat 4: 1st v 8th qualifier

The heat winners are ranked on time, from which the top 2 proceed to the gold medal final and the other 2 proceed to the bronze medal final.

 QG = qualified for gold medal final
 QB = qualified for bronze medal final

Finals 
The final classification is determined in the medal finals.

References

team sprint
Cycling at the Summer Olympics – Women's team sprint
Women's events at the 2016 Summer Olympics
Olymp